The 2020 Republican National Convention in which delegates of the United States Republican Party selected the party's nominees for president and vice president in the 2020 United States presidential election, was held from August 24 to 27, 2020.

Due to the COVID-19 pandemic in the United States, plans to convene a traditional large-scale convention were cancelled a few weeks before the convention.  Primary venues included the Charlotte Convention Center in Charlotte, North Carolina, and the Andrew W. Mellon Auditorium in Washington, D.C., with many other remote venues also being utilized. The convention nominated President Donald Trump and Vice President Mike Pence for reelection.

The convention was originally scheduled to be held at the Spectrum Center in Charlotte, North Carolina, but on June 2, 2020, Trump and the Republican National Committee pulled the event from Charlotte after the North Carolina state government declined to agree to Trump's demands to allow the convention to take place with a full crowd and without public health measures designed to prevent the spread of the COVID-19 pandemic, such as social distancing and face coverings. Trump then announced that the convention would be moved to Jacksonville, Florida, but subsequently cancelled the Jacksonville convention plans on July 23. Some convention proceedings, albeit dramatically reduced in scale, were still held in Charlotte, such as "small, formal business meetings." The party held the rest of the events and festivities, including Trump's acceptance speech, remotely from various locations including Fort McHenry and the White House. By tradition, because Republicans held the presidency, their convention was conducted after the 2020 Democratic National Convention, which was held from August 17–20. Another contrast to typical conventions was the prerecorded nature of much of the convention's content. Former White House director of management and administration Marcia Lee Kelly was named convention president and CEO in April 2019.

The convention utilized federal government properties as locations for events, and Trump displayed official acts of government (issuing a pardon and the presiding over a naturalization during convention broadcasts). This was a\ break from political norms and attracted criticism. Numerous aspects of the convention were cited as potentially violating the Hatch Act of 1939. As part of a later settlement with the U.S. Office of Special Counsel, Lynne Patton, a Trump-appointed administrator in the United States Department of Housing and Urban Development, confessed to violating the Hatch Act of 1939.

Trump faced only token opposition in the Republican primaries and caucuses, and unofficially clinched the Republican nomination in March 2020, when he reached 1,276 pledged delegates. On November 3, 2020, Trump and Pence went on to lose the general election to the Democratic ticket of Joe Biden and Kamala Harris. Refusing to concede, Trump and his allies led various attempts to overturn the 2020 United States presidential election, which were unsuccessful in preventing Biden from becoming the 46th president of the United States.

Background

Original site selection

Las Vegas, Nevada, and Charlotte, North Carolina, were mentioned as possible locations for the 2020 RNC due to their locations within "swing states." Neither had ever hosted a Republican National Convention, although Charlotte had hosted the 2012 Democratic National Convention. A Charlotte television station, WBTV, reported that Charlotte, Las Vegas, and "another unnamed city in Texas, which sources at the meeting said were likely either Dallas or San Antonio" were finalists to host the convention.
Other sources named Dallas, Texas, and New York City, New York, as prospective hosts, while Las Vegas, Nevada; Nashville, Tennessee; Philadelphia, Pennsylvania; and San Antonio, Texas had been under consideration earlier. However, Charlotte was the only city in the country to officially submit a bid for the convention. On July 18, 2018, the RNC Site Selection Committee voted unanimously to recommend holding the convention in Charlotte. The Republican National Committee made the selection official on July 20.

Following President Trump's rally in Greenville, North Carolina, the Charlotte City Council proposed retracting their bid to host the convention. All nine Democrats on the city council voted on a measure calling Trump a racist for his statement ("good people on both sides" of the statue debate). The city met in closed sessions with an attorney regarding their contract to host the convention. A conclusion was made that breaking the contract would likely end with the city being taken to court and forced to host the convention. A resolution was eventually approved by the Charlotte City Council.

Relocation to Jacksonville and reversal

On May 25, 2020, Trump raised the possibility of moving the convention out of Charlotte after North Carolina governor Roy Cooper stated that the convention would need to be scaled down due to the COVID-19 pandemic. On June 2, 2020, after weeks of failed negotiations, Governor Cooper rejected the plans submitted by the Republican Party to host a full-scale convention. Trump announced the cancellation via tweet, stating, "Because of [Cooper], we are now forced to seek another state to host the 2020 Republican National Convention."

RNC officials stressed that the mechanics of the convention would still be held in Charlotte. "The RNC's Executive Committee has voted unanimously to allow the official business of the national convention to continue in Charlotte. Many other cities are eager to host the president's acceptance of the nomination, and we are currently in talks with several of them to host that celebration," said RNC communications director Michael Ahrens.

Republican National Committee officials reportedly considered cities including Atlanta, Dallas, Jacksonville, Nashville, New Orleans, Orlando, Phoenix, and Savannah, and even visited some of these cities.

On June 11, the Republican National Committee confirmed that the main events and speeches of the convention would move to Jacksonville, Florida, including Trump's nomination acceptance speech on August 27 at the VyStar Veterans Memorial Arena. However, the convention's official business will remain in Charlotte with a greatly reduced agenda and number of delegates. August 24 was to see a portion of the convention hosted in Charlotte, with the following three days of the convention being held in Jacksonville.

On July 16, the Jacksonville Republican National Convention Host Committee sent out a letter announcing that, in addition to the VyStar Veterans Memorial Arena, other venues in Jacksonville would be used, including TIAA Bank Field, Daily's Place, 121 Financial Park, and "several other" venues".

However, with the explosion of COVID-19 cases peaking at above 15,000 cases per day in mid-July, the possibility of the Jacksonville convention being canceled as well began to be discussed. Several of the local health restrictions in Charlotte that had prompted the RNC to seek a different location—requirements for people to wear masks and practice social distancing—were later adopted by Jacksonville. Sen. Chuck Grassley, who is 86, said he would skip the convention for the first time in 40 years due to the risk of COVID-19.

On July 23, Trump announced that RNC events scheduled in Jacksonville, Florida, had been cancelled, saying, "The timing for the event is not right." However, Trump also announced that delegate business will still continue in Charlotte.

Relocation of most activity to Washington, D.C.

On August 14, it was announced that much of the convention would take place at the Andrew W. Mellon Auditorium in Washington, D.C. (part of the William Jefferson Clinton Federal Building), which would serve as the convention's "central hub". With some events in Charlotte, this became the first since the 1860 Democratic National Conventions to be centered in two different cities.

Convention committees, meetings before the Convention

Committee on Platform
Rather than adopting a new party platform, the Republicans decided simply to recycle their 2016 party platform, including several references to the "current president" and attacks on "the administration" (which in 2016 referred to Barack Obama and the Obama administration). The decision was criticized by Republican activists. In a tweet, Trump said that he would "prefer a new and updated platform, short form, if possible."

The RNC did not do this, just issuing a one-page document stating opposition to the "Obama/Biden administration" and supporting President Trump's instead.

Committee on Arrangements
On August 1, a Republican convention spokesperson said that, "Given the health restrictions and limitations in place within the state of North Carolina, we are planning for the Charlotte activities to be closed press" for the entirety of the convention. The decision to bar press was criticized by the White House Correspondents' Association. However, a Republican National Committee official cited by the Associated Press indicated that "no final decisions have been made and that logistics and press coverage options were still being evaluated."

Only one-sixth of the delegates (336 out of 2,550) gathered physically in Charlotte, with six delegates from each state and territory. On August 5, convention planners announced a number of health and safety rules for the delegates, vendors, and staff who will gather physically.

On August 12, the chairman of the credentials committee, Doyle Webb, said that a tiny group of reporters would indeed be permitted to cover the one-day official convention and the nominations of Trump and Pence.

Republican National Committee meetings
The Republican National Committee had its semi-annual meeting from August 21 to 23. It was closed to the press.

Logistics
The convention, as originally planned to be held in Charlotte, was initially anticipated to attract 50,000 visitors to the city.

The ultimate format of the convention had much of its content be prerecorded.

Fireworks display
On August 14, the Republican National Committee filed an application with the National Park Service (NPS) requesting to utilize the National Mall, including the Washington Monument, for a fireworks display on the convention's closing night. Their application was approved. Their application stated that a 50-person crew would set up the display, adhering to D.C.'s temporary prohibition on gatherings larger than 50 people. The RNC pledged to reimburse the NPS for all expenses they'd face related to the display. The Republican National Committee reimbursed the federal government for damages to federal property that the show created, which amounted to more than $42,000 of damages. The Republican National Committee also reimbursed the federal government $177,000 to pay for approximately 4,000 hours labor by National Park Service employees to facilitate the display.

The display was reported by USA Today to have used more than 7,800 fireworks. The display lasted roughly six minutes. The display included fireworks which spelled-out the words "Trump 2020". The New York Times described the fireworks display as having been "extensive". The display was created by Fireworks by Grucci, and cost the Trump campaign $477,000. Fireworks by Grucci had previously created the fireworks display for Trumps' "Salute to America" Independence Day celebrations in 2019 and 2020.

The use of property owned by the NPS for the convention's closing fireworks display was argued by some experts to raise ethics concerns that may be in violation of the Hatch Act. Sophia Anken of Business Insider observed that Trump's use of the National Mall for the display, "followed a trend across the convention of Trump putting the symbols and power of his office front and center, a departure from historical norms which has prompted widespread criticism." Journalist Ken Vogel suggested that the fireworks display may have violated a D.C. noise ordinance.

The fireworks display was regarded to have been impressive.

Host committees

Charlotte
Charlotte businessman John Lassiter served as the president and CEO of the Charlotte 2020 Host Committee. Ned Curran, Doug Lebda, and Walter Price served as co-chairs, and were named to those positions in 2018.

The host committee appointed Stephanie Batsell as its volunteer coordinator, John Burleson as its communications director, Heather Dodgins as its director of donor engagement, Haley Habenicht as its events manager, Rachel Kelley as its finance director, and Stephanie Speers as its accounting manager.

The committee released a statement after most of the convention had shifted to Jacksonville criticizing the Republican National Committee for "broken promises".

The committee originally reported raising $44 million for the convention. Due to the majority of the event being shifted away from Charlotte, the Charlotte host committee had millions in leftover funds which it could distribute with few restrictions. The committee originally promised in mid-August to give $3.2 million in funds to local nonprofits and community groups. However, by October, they had only distributed under $400,000 in funds.

Jacksonville
Jacksonville formed their own host committee after being awarded the convention.

The committee's members were announced in mid-June. Jacksonville mayor Lenny Curry and lobbyist Brian Ballard co-chaired the committee. The committee had originally named 32 initial members, including the two co-chairs. The initial 30 additional members were Pet Paradise president and CEO Fernando Acosta-Rua; Corner Lot Properties founder Andy Allen; Sunshine Gasoline Distributors founder Maximo Alvarez; FRP Holdings, Inc. chairman and CEO John Baker; former Florida attorney general Pam Bondi; Florida state senator Rob Bradley; president and CEO of GreenPointe Holdings, LLC Ed Burr; U.S. Sugar senior vice president Robert Coker; Visit Jacksonville president and CEO Michael Corrigan; J.B. Coxwell Contracting president J. David Coxwell; Jodi Coxwell; Florida state representative Travis Cummings; JAX Chamber president and CEO Daniel Davis; Florida Restaurant and Lodging Association president and CEO Carol Dover; Jacksonville Transportation Authority CEO Nat Ford; president of the Florida Senate Bill Galvano; Miranda Contracting president Josh Garrison; health official Leon L. Haley Jr.; Bishop Vaughn McLaughin; Morales Construction Co. president Rick Morales; speaker of the Florida House of Representatives Jose Oliva; businessman Tom Petway; US Assure CEO Ty Petway; The Vestcor Companies founder John Rood; U.S. congressman John Rutherford; Florida Senate president designate Wilton Simpson; Florida House of Representatives speaker designate Chris Sprowls; Total Military Management COO Kent Stermon; JAXUSA Partnership president Aundra Walalce, and U.S. congressman Michael Waltz.

After the initial members were announced, Bishop Vaughn McLaughlin denied his participation, despite having been listed as a member.

Leon Haley Jr. left his position on the committee days after his membership was announced.

The committee reported having raised $4,650,135.20. As of October 2020, the committee had $840,000 in unspent funds.

Location of Trump's acceptance speech

On July 28, Trump said that he would accept the nomination in person in Charlotte. However, on August 5, he said he would "likely" accept the Republican nomination from the White House. A decision to accept a party's nomination from the White House would break a norm; the Associated Press noted that it would "mark an unprecedented use of federal property for partisan political purposes." The proposed plans also raised legal questions under the Hatch Act, which creates certain prohibitions on the use of public resources for political activity, and the legality of the plan was questioned by Republican senators Ron Johnson and John Thune. While the president is exempt from the Hatch Act's restrictions, the law applies to other federal employees. The ethics director of the Campaign Legal Center stated that "any federal employee who helps facilitate the acceptance speech risks violating the Hatch Act."
Nonetheless, Trump tweeted that he had decided to hold it on the White House lawn anyway, announcing on August 13 that he had finalized this decision. It was ultimately decided that Trump's speech would be delivered from the South Lawn.

Since Trump accepted his nomination remotely, it was the first time a Republican nominee has done so since Alf Landon in 1936. Since Democratic nominee Joe Biden also accepted the Democratic nomination remotely (the first time a Democrat has done so since Franklin D. Roosevelt in 1944); 2020 was the first election since 1928 in which neither major-party nominee accepted their nominations in-person.

Security
The convention host committee's director of security was Robert "Bob" O'Donnell, and its deputy director of security was Max Poux.

For the opening day, in which daytime events were held in Charlotte, several roads were closed near and surrounding the Charlotte Convention Center. Local transit services, including the Lynx Light Rail, were modified. A temporary ban on flying unmanned aerial vehicles was put in place in the Charlotte area. The Charlotte-Mecklenburg Police Department spent $17 million in expenditures related to the convention.

The Republican National Convention was originally to be a National Special Security Event. The originally-planned Charlotte convention had been awarded this status. The plans for a convention in Jacksonville had also been awarded this status. Jacksonville had been given $30 million federal grants for security.

The city of Jacksonville had paid $69,777 to a consulting company that was assisting them in security.

When the convention was slated for Jacksonville, there had been concern expressed by Duval County sheriff Mike Williams over the ability of local law enforcement to provide security, due to poor funding and lack of advance planning due to the late change of venue.

Convention leadership
Toni Anne Dashiell served as the chairwoman for the RNC Committee on arrangements for the convention. Former White House director of management and administration Marcia Lee Kelly was named convention president and CEO in April 2019. Stephen "Max" Everett served as the convention's vice president and chief information officer.

Republican National Committee chairwoman Ronna McDaniel also served on the convention's leadership team.

Other leadership team members included chief of program Whitney Anderson, deputy director of operations and buildout Luke Bullock, chief of staff and director of ticketing Chirstine "CC" Cobaugh, deputy director of operations Kelly Eaton, director of communications Blair Ellis, national press secretary Tatum Gibson, director of signature events coordination Kelsey Gorman, deputy director of external affairs Susan Haney, director of transportation Dustin Hendrix, digital director Doug Hochberg, deputy director of finance Jinger Kelley, deputy director of logistics flow & signage Andy King, deputy director of transportation Thomas Krol, director of logistics flow & signange Edith "Dee Dee" Lancaster, counsel Joy Lee, chief of infrastructure Christine “Chris” Lesko, director of delegate experience Diandra Lopez, chief financial officer Thomas Maxwell, chief public affairs officer Dan McCarthy, director of administration Mallory McGough, director of security Robert “Bob” O’Donnell, chief logistics officer Jonathan “Jonny” Oringdulph, director of special projects Yandrick Paraison, director of community affairs Russell Peck, deputy director of security Max Poux, director of executive operations Christopher Reese, director of operations James Sample, director of media operations Lisa Shoemaker, and deputy director of administration Megan Schenewerk.

Format

The nomination event took place in Charlotte, North Carolina, as the party was contractually obligated to conduct its official business there. Only just over 300 delegates were expected to attend.

The main speeches took place every night from 8:30 to 11:00 p.m. EDT. Headlining speakers spoke after 10:00 p.m. The speeches took place in Washington, DC, rather than in Charlotte.

Selection of pledged delegates
The base number of pledged delegates that are allocated to each of the 50 states is 10 at-large delegates, plus 3 district delegates for each congressional district. A fixed number of pledged delegates are allocated to Washington D.C., and each of the five U.S. territories. Bonus delegates are awarded to each state and territory based on whether it has elected (if applicable) through December 31, 2019 (after the 2019 off-year elections): a Republican governor, Republican majorities in either one or both chambers in its state legislature, one or two Republicans to the U.S. Senate, or a Republican majority in its delegation to the U.S. House of Representatives. A state is also awarded additional bonus delegates if it carried the Republican candidate, Trump, in the 2016 presidential election.

Pre-convention delegate count
Under the original plan, 2,550 delegates and half as many alternates were to attend the convention.

Only 336 delegates were able to attend the nomination.

Presidential and vice-presidential balloting
With most of the convention canceled, proxy voting via the attendees was the method of choice. Donald Trump, the sole candidate, received 2,550 certified votes (100% of the total), including one delegate that had been pledged for Bill Weld.

Since 1988, the vice-presidential nomination has been ratified by voice vote. It did so again this time, in the case of Mike Pence.

Once the convention was over, the festivities moved to the nation's capital, and speeches, entertainments and other surprises were presented from venues throughout the country.

Schedule

Charlotte: Monday, August 24

Morning session

The official business of the 2020 Republican National Convention, including the formal nominations of President Trump and Vice President Pence, was held in Charlotte, North Carolina.

The 336 delegates met in the morning from 9 a.m. EDT, after which the committee reports were read and voted on.

Scott Walker placed Pence's name in nomination, who was nominated by voice vote. This was the first time the vice-presidential nomination came first. Michael Whatley, the chair of the North Carolina Republican Party, placed the president's name in nomination and Florida state senator Joe Gruters seconded the nomination. This was followed by the traditional roll-call of the states.

The roll-call was interrupted by addresses from Walker, Vice President Pence, and President Trump himself, who spoke over an hour. All of them addressed the crowd in-person, having flown to Charlotte.

Select speakers:

Washington, D.C.: August 24–27
With the official convention business over, the four-night entertainment event was anchored at the Andrew W. Mellon Auditorium in Washington, D.C., with various other events taking place in that city and elsewhere.

Most speeches were pre-taped.

At events with in-person audiences, such as First Lady Melania Trump and Vice President Mike Pence's speeches, the Centers for Disease Control and Prevention-recommended practices of protective masks and social distancing were largely absent.

August 24: Evening session

Theme: Land of promise

8:30–11:00 p.m. EDT

Schedule:
 Invocation
 Pledge of Allegiance
 Main convention program

Select speakers (in order of appearance):

Select film segments:
 Conversation with COVID-19 frontline workers in the East Room of the White House (featuring President Donald Trump)
 Conversation with released overseas prisoners Diplomatic Reception Room of the White House (featuring President Donald Trump)

Tuesday, August 25 

8:30–11:00 p.m. EDT

Theme: Land of opportunity

 Invocation by Pastor Norma Urrabazo
 Main convention ceremony

Select speakers (in order of appearance):

Mary Ann Mendoza had also been scheduled to speak. However, just hours before her part in the program, she posted a tweet in support of an antisemitic conspiracy theory and specifically highlighted its reference to the Protocols of the Elders of Zion. The RNC immediately canceled her appearance.

Select video segments:
 Donald Trump pardoning Jon Ponder at the White House
 Naturalization ceremony at the White House (featuring Donald Trump and Chad Wolf)

Wednesday, August 26 

8:30–11:00 p.m. EDT

Schedule:
 Invocation by Rabbi Aryeh Spero
 Pledge of Allegiance by Joseph Deslauriers
 Main convention program
 Performance of the national anthem ("The Star-Spangled Banner") by Trace Adkins

Theme: Land of heroes

Select speakers (in order of appearance):

Thursday, August 27 

8:30–11:00 p.m. EDT

Theme: Land of greatness

Schedule:
 Invocation by Franklin Graham
 Pledge of Allegiance performed by Madeleine and Jackson Kratzer
 Main convention program
 Fireworks
 Musical performance by Christopher Macchio

Speakers (in order of appearance):

Notable speeches

Kimberly Guilfoyle

Kimberly Guilfoyle, a Trump campaign spokesperson and the girlfriend of the president's son Donald Trump, Jr., spoke on the opening night of the convention. She painted a stark picture of an America led by Democratic nominee Joe Biden. Guilfoyle attacked Democrats, blaming them for a "cancel culture" amongst other attacks. In part of her speech, she criticized the governance of California, a state whose governor was her ex-husband, Democratic governor Gavin Newsom.
Guilfoyle shouted most of her remarks, and her delivery was consequentially characterized as "loud", resulting in uttering the last sentences of her speech, specifically "the best is yet to come!!!" becoming the "Guilfoyle Challenge". Her speech was characterized as "dark" in its tone and delivery, for which it received some criticism from both conservative and liberal figures.

Nikki Haley

Former United States Ambassador to the United Nations Nikki Haley spoke on the opening night of the convention. Early into her speech, she quoted fellow former United States Ambassador to the United Nations Jeane Kirkpatrick as having said, "Democrats always blame America first". This was a key line from Kirkpatrick's own speech to the 1984 Republican National Convention.

In her speech, Haley invoked her parents, both immigrants from India.

Haley also linked Democratic nominee Joe Biden with the "socialist left". Biden has admitted that he would be the "most progressive President in history". She also painted the prospect of a Biden presidency as beneficial to the interests of China and Iran. Haley offered strong criticism of the foreign policy of the Obama administration, in which Biden served as vice president. She argued that while Trump "has a record of strength and success," Biden "has a record of weakness and failure," and that while Trump has "moved America forward," Biden has "held America back".

Tim Scott

United States senator from South Carolina Tim Scott spoke on the opening night of the convention. In his speech, Scott declared that, "2020 has tested our nation in ways we haven't seen for decades," invoking the COVID-19 pandemic as well as the murder of George Floyd and shooting of Breonna Taylor as having tested the United States.

Scott praised the Trump administration's actions on police reform. Scott cited the opportunity zones as something he had worked with Trump on creating (neglecting to mention the key involvement of Democrats Cory Booker and Ron Kind, who had proposed the idea in collaboration with Scott).

Scott declared his support for school choice. He declared opposition to cancel culture. He declared his belief in "the goodness of America".

He quoted Democratic presidential nominee Joe Biden as having said numerous remarks offensive to him as a black man. He also criticized Biden's actions, such as his involvement in the 1994 Crime Bill.

Scott accused Biden of wanting to give tax cuts to "blue state" millionaires as the expense of most Americans. Scott painted Trump's own Tax Cuts and Jobs Act of 2017 as having benefitied "single moms, working families, and those in need".

Scott attempted to tie Biden and his running mate Kamala Harris to socialism. He declared, "Joe Biden's radical Democrats are trying to permanently transform what it means to be an American. Make no mistake, Joe Biden and Kamala Harris want a cultural revolution. A fundamentally different America. If we let them, they will turn our country into a socialist utopia, and history has taught us that path only leads to pain and misery, especially for hard-working people hoping to rise."

Scott's speech also featured autobiographical elements.

President Donald Trump

President Donald Trump delivered his acceptance speech on the final night of the convention from the South Lawn of the White House in Washington, D.C.

Trump's speech sought to defend his own record as president, especially his administration's response to the COVID-19 pandemic, which culminates in the quest for a DNA vaccine code-named Operation Warp Speed.

Trump mentioned his main opponent, Democratic nominee Joe Biden, by name 41 times. In contrast, Biden's own Democratic nomination acceptance speech one week prior featured no utterances of Trump's name.

The speech cast Biden as "weak", and an instrument of left-wing portion of the Democratic Party, going as far as to dub him a "Trojan horse for socialism.” He also characterized Biden as a potential, "destroyer of American greatness." The speech also attacked Biden's record.

Personalities at CNN and USA Today identified more than 20 "false, exaggerated or misleading claims" in Trump's speech.

According to the American Presidency Project, at 70 minutes duration, Trump's acceptance speech was the second-longest major-party nomination acceptance speech, behind only his own 2016 acceptance speech.

Donald Trump Jr.

The son of the president spoke on the opening night of the convention. He cast a picture of a descent into anarchy, violence, and oppression if the Democratic ticket wins the election. Trump Jr. portrayed the opposition as plotting to destroy the American way of life. He warned that Democrats, "want to bully us into submission. If they get their way, it will no longer be the silent majority. It will be the silenced majority." He also accused them of, "attacking the very principles on which our nation was founded—freedom of thought, freedom of speech, freedom of religion, the rule of law."

He derided his father's main opponent for the presidency, Democratic nominee Biden, with numerous nicknames, including "Beijing Biden" and "the Loch Ness Monster of the swamp". He touted the shape of the economy prior to COVID-19, and blamed the pandemic on the Chinese Communist Party.

Ivanka Trump

President Trump's eldest daughter spoke on the fourth night of the convention. "I'm Still Standing" by Elton John was played as Ivanka walked onto the stage. She first talked about how Donald Trump is "the people's president", and how her children love him. She then talked about how most politicians blame each other for problems, but that Donald Trump hasn't done that, and that "the best is yet to come" with regards to the country's achievements. Ivanka also talked about her father's various accomplishments in the construction industry, foreign trade, the COVID-19 pandemic, criminal justice, female unemployment, child care, tax cuts, pharmaceutical drugs, human trafficking, and foreign military intervention; she mentioned the release of Alice Marie Johnson, who was in the audience at the time. During her speech, the audience chanted "Four more years!". Finally, she introduced Trump, after which he gave his acceptance speech.

First Lady Melania Trump

Melania Trump spoke on the second night of the convention. Before she took the stage, a narrated montage of her accomplishments, most notably her "Be Best" campaign, was played. Melania first thanked the people who elected Donald Trump in 2016, offered sympathy to COVID-19 victims and thanked essential workers, acknowledged the 100-year anniversary of the passage of the Nineteenth Amendment to the United States Constitution, and then thanked her parents for enabling her to go from Slovenia (which was under Communist rule at the time) to the United States to work in the fashion industry. She then talked about how she supports the right of all people to achieve the American Dream, and how she has seen and spoken with many people who were striving to do that; she also thanked "all who serve our country", specifically first responders and military officers, for their service. After that, she talked about natural disasters, and how the response shows a "beautiful side of humanity" in contrast to the disasters themselves. Melania then talked about how Donald Trump has not "lost focus" on the people despite the constant attacks by his opponents, and how he "demands action" as opposed to simply speaking words. After that, she talked more about her work with children, including her "Be Best" campaign, and how it should not be a political goal; she mentioned her trip to Africa, and how she was "horrified" after learning about the slave trade. She then talked about the George Floyd protests and called for peace and mutual understanding between both sides. Melania then talked about Donald Trump's accomplishments in combating religious persecution and opioid addiction, as well as her own future work with children and minority communities, and with restoring the People's House. Finally, she talked about the impact on social media on children and teenagers, and more about Donald Trump's general accomplishments and how voting for him would be a "common sense" vote as opposed to a partisan vote.

Demonstrations and protests
In the days before the convention, protests began to arise against it in Charlotte, North Carolina, and Washington, D.C.

Counter-convention
In May 2020, Republicans opposed to Trump's presidency announced their intent to host a competing "Convention on Founding Principles" to occur at the same time as the Republican National Convention in Charlotte. Among the scheduled speakers are former CIA director Michael Hayden; former FBI director James Comey; some former Republican elected officials, including former New Jersey governor Christine Todd Whitman, former congressman Mark Sanford, former congressman Charlie Dent, and Nebraska state senator John S. McCollister; Trump's onetime communications director Anthony Scaramucci; 2016 independent presidential candidate Evan McMullin; and several founders of the Lincoln Project.

The Commitment March: Get Your Knee Off Our Necks

Al Sharpton's National Action Network initially had gotten the permits to have a large march and rally of up to 100,000 people in the National Mall for August 28, with earlier events taking place in the days just before. This was well before the Republicans' convention was moved to the city.

Controversies

Ann Dorn's speech
The daughters of David Dorn took objection to Ann Dorn, his widow, utilizing their father's death to support the candidacy of Trump, to whom they claimed their father was politically opposed.

COVID-19 risks

Crowds during convention
At events with in-person audiences, such as First Lady Melania Trump, Vice President Mike Pence, Ivanka Trump, and President Donald Trump's speeches, the Centers for Disease Control and Prevention-recommended practices of protective masks and social distancing were largely absent. Many audience members had not been tested for COVID-19.

During the convention, the first and second families were seen without masks mingling without social distancing in crowds of people also without masks. The crowd of 1,500 at the White House on the final night also greatly flouted Washington, D.C. regulations prohibiting gatherings of more than 50 people.

Despite having been required to wear protective masks and social distance, many delegates at the morning session of the opening day, held in Charlotte, did not wear protective masks and failed to socially distance, attracting controversy. Local health officials voiced concern. Four days later, August 28, it was reported that four people associated with the Charlotte event—two attendees of the morning session and two support staff—had subsequently tested positive for COVID-19.

This stood in strong contrast with the Democratic National Convention held the prior week, where the only in-person audience was a parking lot of spectators socially distanced (viewing from their cars) for the fireworks finale of the final night, and where masks were worn at times by both the presidential and vice-presidential nominees and their spouses.

Earlier convention plans
Safety concerns were raised over earlier plans to hold a large-scale in-person convention amid a pandemic. Despite these concerns, Trump, for an extended period of time, had resisted calls to scale-back the convention.

When the event was slated to be held in Jacksonville, residents and business owners near the VyStar Arena filed a lawsuit asking a judge to declare the event a "public nuisance" due to the health risk it posed "under the circumstances and practices encouraged and required by the Republican National Committee", and asked the judge to thereby either block the event from using the arena, or to limit the attendance to only 2,500 people.

Politicization of the office of Secretary of State 
Secretary of state Mike Pompeo's convention address, delivered while on a diplomatic trip to Israel, has been cited as a possible Hatch Act violation.

On August 25, the same day that Pompeo spoke, chairman of the House Foreign Affairs Subcommittee on Oversight and Investigations and Democrat Joaquin Castro opened a congressional investigation into the legality of Pompeo's planned speech. On October 26, 2020, Democrats Eliot Engel (Chairman of the House Committee on Foreign Affairs) and Nita Lowey (Chairwoman of the House Committee on Appropriations), confirmed that the Office of Special Counsel had launched a probe into possible Hatch Act violations related to Pompeo's speech.

The appropriateness of having the incumbent secretary of state, Mike Pompeo, address a political convention was questioned. Pompeo's modern predecessors had avoided political conventions while serving as secretary of state. The speech came despite Pompeo having warned other diplomats against "improperly" taking part in politics.

Politicization of the White House and other federal government sites
Sophia Ankel of USA Today observed that the use of sites that were symbolic of the federal government for a political convention marked a divergence from political norms and was broadly criticized. The convention use of the White House as a setting for parts of the convention brought criticism which argued that Trump was utilizing the White House for purely political events to an degree that none of his presidential predecessors had.

Some experts and politicians questioned the legality of the use of the White House for convention speeches and other portions of the convention. The questions of it legality centered upon the premise that any federal employees (exempting the president and vice president themselves) who assisted in such campaigning activities on a federal government property were potentially violating the Hatch Act. The convention speech by Ivanka Trump, an official White House advisor, on the South Lawn of the White House while holding an official position in the federal government was also cited as a potential Hatch Act violation.

The use of property owned by the National Park Service for the convention's closing fireworks display was argued by some experts to raise ethics concerns and constitute potential violations of the Hatch Act.

Lynne Patton's Hatch Act violation
In April 2021, Lynn Patton, who was administrator of the United States Department of Housing and Urban Development for Region II at the time of the Republican National Convention, was fined $1,000 and barred for four years from federal employment as part of a settlement with the U.S. Office of Special Counsel, after admitting to violating the Hatch Act of 1939 by using her official federal government position to produce a video segment featuring residents of the New York City Housing Authority. She had utilized her role to develop relationships which she used to recruit participants for interviews she conducted in order to produce the video segment.

Shortly after the convention, Democratic New York City councilman (and congressional candidate) Ritchie Torres demanded that there be a federal probe into Patton's actions. In October 2020, a report released by the office of Democratic United States Senator Elizabeth Warren, compiled by her staff, on potential Hatch Act violations by the Trump administration had cited this as one of Patton's potential Hatch Act violations.

Other potential Hatch Act violations
Many aspects of the convention have been cited as potential violations of the Hatch Act.

On September 3, 2020, Democrats on the House Committee on Oversight and Reform wrote a letter to the Office of Special Counsel urging them to launch an investigation of, “multiple, repeated violations” of the Hatch Act committed during the convention.

Chad Wolf's participation in naturalization ceremony segment
Acting United States Secretary of Homeland Security Chad Wolf's appearance in the naturalization ceremony, which was part of the convention's program, has been cited by some as a potential violation of the Hatch Act. Citizens for Responsibility and Ethics in Washington filed a complaint with the Office of Special Counsel, arguing this was a clear violation of the Hatch Act.

Use of official acts of office in convention program
Journalists have questioned the ethics of President Trump using video of official acts of office, such as a video of a pardon ceremony and participating in a prerecorded naturalization ceremony, as portions of the convention program. These have been criticized as a politicization of government functions. The display of such presidential powers as part of a political party convention diverged United States political norms.

Use of unwitting participants

Several individuals featured in the convention were unwitting of their inclusion in the convention.

Several of the participants of the naturalization ceremony have come forward to complain that they were not informed that it was going to be part of the Republican National Convention.

Several of those featured in a video segment with residents of the New York City Housing Authority complained that they did not know that their interviews would be used for the Republican National Convention, and that they did not support Trump.

Broadcast and media coverage
It was announced August 2, 2020, that reporters would not be permitted on-site during the delegate business in Charlotte, but that the convention would, however, be live-streamed. This would mark the first time in modern history that the media will not be granted access to the nominating event of a major party candidate. However, the Republican National Committee walked this back, saying that the decision to bar reporters from entry had not been made final. On August 5, President Trump stated that the convention, in fact, would be open to the press.

Evening television viewership

Night 1
Night one of the Republican convention had 17.0 million viewers across all cable and television networks tracked by Nielsen. The first night of the Democratic convention had 19.7 million viewers across the same networks.
As per the table below, across six major, traditional television (NBC, CBS, ABC) and cable networks (FNC, CNN, MSNBC) tracked by Nielsen, night one of the Republican convention had 15.9 million viewers, compared to 18.8 million viewers for night one of the Democratic convention. According to C-SPAN, night one of the Republican convention had 440,000 viewers on C-SPAN, compared to 76,000 viewers for night one of the Democratic convention.

Compared to 2016, the only cable or television network that saw a rise in viewership for Night 1 was Fox News Channel.

Night 2
Night two of the Republican convention had 19.4 million viewers across all television networks tracked by Nielsen. The second night of the Democratic convention had 19.2 million viewers across the same networks.
As per the table below, night two of the Republican convention had 18 million viewers across six major, traditional television and cable networks tracked by Nielsen. The second night of the Democratic convention had 18.5 million viewers across the same six networks.

These numbers do not include viewers on streaming services.

Compared to 2016, the only networks that saw a rise in viewership for Night 2 were Fox News Channel and MSNBC.

Night 3
Night three of the Republican convention had 17.3 million viewers across all television networks tracked by Nielsen. The third night of the Democratic convention had 22.8 million viewers across the same networks.

Compared to Night 2, the only network that saw a rise in viewership for Night 3 was CBS.

Compared to 2016, every network had a decline in viewership for Night 3. (Note: Many along the south coast of the United States were preparing for Hurricane Laura, and this likely contributed towards the drop in viewership.)

Night 4
Night four of the Republican convention had 23.8 million viewers across all television networks tracked by Nielsen. The fourth night of the Democratic convention had 24.6 million viewers across the same networks. Compared to Night 3, all six networks saw a rise in viewership for Night 4. Compared to 2016, every network had a decline in viewership for Night 4.

Impact
An August 30 ABC poll found no increase in Trump's favorability ratings following the convention. Further polling indicated that there had been virtually no convention bounce for either party. Some polling even showed Trump's favorability rating to have declined following the convention.

Ahead of, and during, the conventions, various outlets had speculated that significant convention bounces were unlikely for either party. This was due to several cited factors. One was that it had been observed that convention bounces had been more minuscule in recent elections. Per some calculations, convention bounces had averaged just 2 points since 2004, compared to just under 7 points between 1968 and 2000. Per other calculations, average bounces since 1996 averaged 3.6 points while bounces between 1962 and 1992 averaged 6.3 points. Another factor cited for why it was seen as unlikely for either party to generate a significant convention bounce in 2020  was that polls in the 2020 race had, in the months prior to the convention, shown a remarkably steady race, with Biden consistently holding an average lead of 6 points, exceeding a 10-point lead in some polls and never slipping below a lead of 4 points in the polling average. It has been shown that more stable races tend to see smaller convention bounces. Another was that the conventions, having been scaled-back due to the COVID-19 pandemic, were seen as less likely to generate as much attention as past conventions had, particularly due to the decrease in television viewership. Another was that the electorate was already strongly opinionated on the candidates, with more voters holding a strong opinion on Trump than any incumbent since at least 1980, and more voters holding a strong opinion on Biden than any challenger to an incumbent since at least 1980. Races where voters hold strong opinions on the candidates tend to see smaller convention bounces. Strong partisanship among the electorate was another cited factor.

See also

 2020 Republican Party presidential primaries
 2020 Democratic National Convention
 2020 Libertarian National Convention
 2020 Green National Convention
 2020 Constitution Party National Convention
 2020 United States presidential election
 Impact of the COVID-19 pandemic on politics

References

External links 
 President Trump Re-nomination Acceptance Speech for President at RNC at The American Presidency Project
 2020 Official website for the 2020 Republican National Convention 

Republican National Conventions
Republican National Convention
2020 conferences
2020 in North Carolina
Conventions in Charlotte, North Carolina
Political conventions in North Carolina
Political controversies in television
Television controversies in the United States
Impact of the COVID-19 pandemic on politics
Republican National Convention, 2020
Republican National Convention
Articles containing video clips